Versioning may refer to:
 Version control, the management of changes to documents, computer programs, large web sites, and other collections of information
 Versioning file system, which allows a computer file to exist in several versions at the same time
 Software versioning, the process of assigning either unique version names or numbers to unique states of computer software

See also 
 Version (disambiguation)